Willow River station is on the Canadian National Railway mainline in Willow River, British Columbia.  Via Rail's Jasper – Prince Rupert train calls at the station as a flag stop.

Footnotes

External links 
Via Rail Station Description

Via Rail stations in British Columbia